NUU may refer to:

 University of Ulster at Coleraine in Northern Ireland, United Kingdom
 National United University in Miaoli County, Taiwan
 NUU mobile is a Miami-headquartered phone OEM